Samia "Sam" Doumit is an American actress.

Early life

Doumit is of Irish, French, Lebanese, German, and Jewish descent (mother's side).  She was a Dean's list and honor roll student at Emerson College in Boston before attending the California Institute of the Arts.  Doumit's great-uncle is Nobel Peace Prize recipient Dr. Albert Schweitzer.

Career
Sam Doumit starred in the film The Hot Chick with Rob Schneider, Adam Sandler, Anna Faris, and Rachel McAdams as well as the independent film The Utopian Society. She is featured in the Zed video clip  "Starlight", included on The Hot Chick DVD. She guest starred on ABC's Castle, Showtime's series Shameless, Criminal Minds, The Mentalist on CBS, and Harry’s Law with Kathy Bates. Doumit guest-starred in the series finale of the series LAX.  She played Allison in the never-aired series The Jake Effect with Jason Bateman.  She played "Maggie", a recurring character on Disney's Honey, I Shrunk the Kids: The TV Show. Sam was a series regular on MTV’s first scripted series Undressed, playing Jana.   Doumit worked with her friend, actor Jeremy Sisto, in the series finale of Dawson's Creek and the film Little Savant. Doumit played a drug addled prostitute in an episode of Southland. She played the lead role “Rosie” in the 10 episode limited series Red Riding Hoods

Doumit began acting on stage at age 5. She has performed in over 30 professional plays including "Bonnie" in Hurlyburly, "Laura" in The Glass Menagerie and "Juliet" in Romeo and Juliet.  She played a stage actress in KY2 in 2000. 

In October 2005, she wrote, directed and performed "Not to Fear", a daring performance art piece in the Half-Hour From Home: Cal-Arts Alumni at Barnsdall, organized by Cal-Arts. 

Samia Doumit played "Kate" in Shakespeare's The Taming of the Shrew at the Lillian Theatre in Los Angeles.  Her portrayal of "Kate" was featured in an interview and article for Estylo Magazine.  In 2009-2010 Doumit played 8 comedic characters in the long running hit Jewtopia at The Greenway Court Theatre in Los Angeles.

Doumit is the face of the SuicideGirls logo. She hosted "Suicide Girls Radio" Sunday nights on Indie 103.1 FM in Los Angeles from 2006 to 2011. It was voted #1 Radio in 2009 by Rolling Stone Magazine

Doumit married Erik Contreras on September 3, 2005.

Filmography

Film

 On the Ropes (1999) ..... Maya
 Taylor's Wall (2001) ..... Taylor Manning
 Beyond the Pale (2001) ..... Dina
 The Hot Chick (2002) ..... Eden
 The Utopian Society (2003) ..... Nera
 Longtime Listener 12th Time Caller (Voice) (2004) ..... Nancy
 Just Hustle (2004) ..... Naomi Rose
 East L.A ..... Krista Guzman
 Rosary Stars ..... Herself

Television

Beverly Hills, 90210 (1998)
Undressed (1999)
Brutally Normal (2000)
Honey, I Shrunk the Kids: The TV Show (2000)
ER (2001)
Boston Public (2002)
Dawson's Creek (2003)
CSI: Crime Scene Investigation (2004)
Passions (2005)
LAX (2005)
The Jake Effect (2006)
Southland (2009)
Castle (2010)
The Mentalist (2010)
Shameless (2010)
Matumbo Goldberg (2011)
Harry's Law (2011)Crazy White Chicks (2014)Criminal Minds (2018)Red Riding Hoods ''(2021)

References

 Jewtopia Play 
 TV Tome 
 
 Just Hustle Movie 
 Longtime Listener 12th Time Caller

External links
 Sam Doumit Official Website 
 
 The Utopian Society Official Site

Living people
20th-century American actresses
21st-century American actresses
American film actresses
American stage actresses
American television actresses
Place of birth missing (living people)
Year of birth missing (living people)
Emerson College alumni
Actresses from Sacramento, California
American people of German-Jewish descent
American people of Lebanese descent
California Institute of the Arts alumni